Grateley railway station serves the village of Grateley, Hampshire, England, and the surrounding countryside. It is operated by South Western Railway.

The station opened on 1 May 1857. Since then, a new settlement has grown up around the station.

On 5 June 1861, the Grateley station master was killed as a result of a driver and guard rushing to move freight wagons.

The station has few facilities and is unmanned. There is a self-service ticket machine on platform 1 and smartcard readers on both platforms. There are two car parks for the large number of commuters who use the station. Displays on each platform show the next two trains.
All trains are operated by South Western Railway.

Services
South Western Railway operates an hourly service between London Waterloo and Salisbury with limited extensions to Bristol Temple Meads, Exeter St Davids and Yeovil Pen Mill. A seasonal service runs once each way on a Saturday between Waterloo and Weymouth, operating from late May to early September.

Trains are once per hour each way on weekdays, then decreasing to once every two hours each way on Sundays.

References

Railway stations in Hampshire
DfT Category F1 stations
Former London and South Western Railway stations
Railway stations in Great Britain opened in 1857
Railway stations served by South Western Railway
1857 establishments in England